Coleoxestia globulicollis is a species of beetle in the family Cerambycidae.

References

Coleoxestia
Beetles described in 1892